Sarai Manihar is a village in Sumerpur block of Unnao district, Uttar Pradesh, India. As of 2011, its population is 1,919, in 352 households, and it has two primary schools and no healthcare facilities.

The 1961 census recorded Sarai Manihar (here spelled "Sarai Manhar") as comprising 4 hamlets, with a total population of 716 (372 male and 344 female), in 239 households and 171 physical houses. The area of the village was given as 754 acres.

References

Villages in Unnao district
Caravanserais in India